Polecat Creek is a stream in the U.S. state of Iowa. It is a tributary to Honey Creek.

Polecat Creek was named for the polecats which roamed along its course.

References

Rivers of Iowa
Rivers of Boone County, Iowa